St. Ottilien station is a railway station in the municipality of Eresing, in Bavaria, Germany. It is located on the Mering–Weilheim line of Deutsche Bahn. The station takes its name from the nearby St. Ottilien Archabbey.

Services
 the following services stop at St. Ottilien:

References

External links
 
 St. Ottilien layout 
 

Railway stations in Bavaria
Buildings and structures in Landsberg (district)